Osney Cemetery is a disused Church of England cemetery in Osney, west Oxford, England. It is in Mill Street south of Botley Road and near the site of Osney Abbey. It borders the Cherwell Valley Line railway a short distance south of Oxford railway station.

The cemetery was established in 1848, along with Holywell Cemetery and St Sepulchre's Cemetery, because central Oxford churchyards were becoming full. In 1855, new burials were forbidden at all Oxford city churches, apart from in existing vaults.

The entrance has a lych gate.

The cemetery contains 26 Commonwealth war graves from the First World War and also one British soldier killed in the Second World War.

The cemetery is now closed to new burials. It is still a large green space in central Oxford. It has been proposed to plant more native trees in the area.

See also
 Holywell Cemetery
 St Sepulchre's Cemetery
 Wolvercote Cemetery

References

External links
 Monumental inscriptions (available on CD)
 Mursejlerne photographs: Osney Cemetery
 

1848 establishments in England
Cemeteries in Oxford
Anglican cemeteries in the United Kingdom
Christianity in Oxford
Commonwealth War Graves Commission cemeteries in England